Professor Toby Kiers is an evolutionary biologist. She is a University Research Chair and Professor at Vrije Universiteit Amsterdam. Kiers pioneered an economic interpretation of the interactions and exchanges between plants, fungi and microbes in mycorrhizal networks. She co-founded the Society for the Protection of Underground Networks (SPUN).

Early life and education 
Kiers attended The Mountain School in Vermont for her fall 1992 high school semester.

Kiers received her B.A. in 1999 from Bowdoin College. In 1997, she spent time as a student at the Smithsonian Tropical Research Institute and gave a talk.

She did her Ph.D. at UC Davis, completing a thesis entitled Evolution of cooperation in the legume-rhizobium symbiosis in 2005 supervised by Robert Ford Denison.

Career and research 
Kiers did research in Panama and Japan after her degree before being appointed professor at Vrije Universiteit Amsterdam. She is also a Senior Research Associate at the University of Oxford.

Kiers is best known for her work on mycorrhizal networks, studying the rates of exchange of nutrients. Her observations are that fungi in the soil behave as economic agents in a free-market system, supplying more phosphorus to plants that are able to deliver more sugar in exchange. Based on this hypothesis, Kiers is interested in developing fungi that behave "altruistically" in their environment to foster efficient plant growth and reduce the need for fertilizers. This interpretation of soil interactions as competition complicated the picture of a collaborative equilibrium that had begun to develop prior. It also allows Kiers to borrow mathematical models from economic theory to characterize nutrient exchanges. To track the flow of nutrients, Kiers has pioneered the use of quantum dots to tag molecules so that they fluoresce and can be more easily differentiated. Her work also concerns the evolution of plant-fungal interactions as the organisms evolve and enter into contact with new partners. Her research is supported by the European Research Council, the Netherlands Organisation for Scientific Research (NWO) and the National Science Foundation.

Kiers's economic interpretation of nutrient exchange is not universally accepted. Others have noted that this perspective anthropomorphizes fungi in a way that may not accurately capture the true dynamics of the system. By assuming that each organism acts to further its own personal gain, the theory neglects the possibility that plants and fungi may exist in a fully collaborative relationship with well-aligned interests.

Kiers participates in science outreach events and talks. In 2019, she gave a TED talk on her work entitled "Lessons from fungi on markets and economics". She has been a speaker at Brave New World events, at Ars Electronica Gardens and at Cambridge University. Kiers has also worked in collaboration with artists. She helped to create an art installation with Isaac Monté and worked with designer Niels Hoebers to create an animated short film as a visual aid for her research presentations. Her research and comments on mycorrhizal networks were featured in the 2020 book Entangled Life.

Kiers has launched a non-profit organization called Society for the Protection of Underground Networks (SPUN) dedicated to informing the public about mycorrhizal networks, protecting biodiversity hotspots, and promoting further research.

Awards and honours 

 2019 Laureate, Ammodo Science Award in Natural Sciences.
 2015 Bio Art & Design (BAD) Award in collaboration with artist Isaac Monté.

Personal life 

She is married and has two children.

Kiers has been a strong advocate against bioengineered food, demanding that labels clearly indicate the presence of genetically engineered ingredients.

References

External links 
 Toby Kiers website
 
  (TED talk)
 Ammodo Science Award 2019 - Toby Kiers

1976 births
Living people
Women evolutionary biologists
Women mycologists
Academic staff of Vrije Universiteit Amsterdam
University of California, Davis alumni